St Ives railway station is a former railway station in St Ives, Cambridgeshire. It formed a junction, with lines to the east heading towards Cambridge, north towards Ely and March and west towards Godmanchester. It opened on 19 August 1847, closed on 5 October 1970, and was demolished in 1977. The site is now occupied by the St. Ives "Park and Ride" area.

References

External links

 St Ives station on navigable 1946 O. S. map
 St Ives station on Subterranea Britannica

Disused railway stations in Cambridgeshire
Former Great Northern and Great Eastern Joint Railway stations
Railway stations in Great Britain opened in 1847
Railway stations in Great Britain closed in 1970
Beeching closures in England
1847 establishments in England
Railway station